Roundwood Halt railway station co-served the town of Harpenden, Hertfordshire, England from 1927 to 1949 on the Nickey Line.

History 
The station opened on 8 August 1927 by the Midland Railway. It was situated south of the junction on Roundwood Road. It was planned to serve a housing development in Harpenden. This didn't last long, thus the station closed on 16 June 1947.

References

External links 

Disused railway stations in Hertfordshire
Former London, Midland and Scottish Railway stations
Railway stations opened in 1927
Railway stations closed in 1947
1927 establishments in England
1947 disestablishments in England
Railway stations in Great Britain opened in the 20th century